Fitzpatrick station is a Via Rail station in Fitzpatrick, Quebec, Canada. It is a request stop, indicated only by a signpost.

External links

Via Rail stations in Quebec
Railway stations in Mauricie
La Tuque, Quebec